Bentué de Rasal is a village under the local government of the municipality of Arguis, Hoya de Huesca, Huesca, Aragon, Spain.

Populated places in the Province of Huesca